

Events

January events
 January 1 – The Ilford rail crash in England kills ten.
 January 15 – The final spike is driven on the transcontinental Canadian Northern Railway at Basque, British Columbia.

March events
 March 7 – San Diego's Union Station officially opens, ushering in a new era of rail transport for the City.
 March 15 – The Chicago, Indianapolis and Louisville Railway, later known as the Monon Railroad, acquires control of the Chicago and Wabash Valley Railroad.

April events
 Baldwin Locomotive Works delivers the first of 280 Péchot-Bourdon locomotives for the French trench railways on the Western Front (World War I).
 April 15 – Musashino Railway Line, Ikebukuro of Tokyo to Hannō route officially completed in Japan.(as predecessor of Seibu Ikebukuro Line).
 April 20 – The Chicago, Rock Island and Pacific Railway enters receivership with J. M. Dickinson and H. U. Mudge appointed as receivers.

May events
 May 8 – Schwyzer Strassenbahnen (SStB) opens connecting Ibach, Schwyz, and Brunnen Schifflände, Switzerland.
 May 22 – In the Quintinshill rail crash, four trains including a troop train collide, the accident and ensuing fire causing 226 fatalities and injuring 246 people at Quintinshill, Gretna Green, Scotland; the accident is blamed on negligence by the signalmen during a shift change at a busy junction.

June events 
 June 22 – BMT Sea Beach Line opens as a New York City Subway line and AB Standard cars enter service.

August events 
 August 1 – Estación Retiro in Buenos Aires, Argentina, opens.
 August 14 – The Weedon rail crash in England kills ten.
 August 28 – The first train operates over the regauged Ravenglass and Eskdale Railway using  gauge equipment.

September events 
 September 11 – The Pennsylvania Railroad begins electrified commuter rail service between Paoli and Philadelphia, using overhead AC trolley wires for power.
 September 14 – The funeral train for William Cornelius Van Horne departs Windsor Station (Montreal) at 11:00 AM bound for Joliet, Illinois; the train is pulled by CP 4-6-2 no. 2213.

October events 
 October 1 – Atchison, Topeka and Santa Fe Railway introduces the Navajo passenger train in San Francisco-Los Angeles-Chicago service as a replacement for the Tourist Flyer.
 October 27 – Keihan Electric Railway, Tenmabashi of Osaka via Hirakata to Sanjo of Kyoto route officially complete in Japan.
 c. October 30 – Railway to Beersheba opens.

November events 
 November 6 – The Delaware, Lackawanna and Western Railroad's Tunkhannock Viaduct, with 10 arches totalling 2,375 ft (724 m) in length and 240 ft (73.15 m) from creekbed forming the world's largest reinforced concrete structure at this date, is officially opened.

December events
 December 16 – William Kissam Vanderbilt is found to be in violation of antitrust laws in the United States because the New York Central owns a controlling interest in the Nickel Plate Road, both of which Vanderbilt owns.
 December 17 – The St Bedes Junction rail crash in England kills nineteen people.

Unknown date events
 First Russian locomotive class Ye 2-10-0s built in North America. By the end of World War II, more than three thousand will have been built to the same basic design.

Births

September births 
 September 11 – Carl Fallberg, cartoonist who created Fiddletown & Copperopolis (died 1996).

December births 
 December 10 – William N. Deramus III, president of Chicago Great Western Railway 1949–1957, Missouri–Kansas–Texas Railroad 1957–1961, Kansas City Southern Railway 1961–1973, is born (died 1989).

Deaths

May deaths
 May 20 – Charles Francis Adams Jr., president of the Union Pacific Railroad 1884–1890 (born 1835).

September deaths
 September 11 – William Cornelius Van Horne, oversaw the major construction of the Canadian Pacific Railway, youngest superintendent of Illinois Central Railroad (born 1843).

References

 Colin Churcher's Railway Pages (August 16, 2005), Significant dates in Canadian railway history. Retrieved September 13, 2005.